Blakesburg is an unincorporated community in Russell Township, Putnam County, in the U.S. state of Indiana.

History
A post office was established at Blakesburg in 1828, and remained in operation until 1839. The community was named after an early settler named Blake.

Geography

References

Unincorporated communities in Putnam County, Indiana
Unincorporated communities in Indiana